Thomas Joseph Davey (born September 11, 1973) is an American former professional baseball pitcher. At 6'7", Davey was a right-handed relief pitcher for three years with the Toronto Blue Jays, Seattle Mariners (1999), and San Diego Padres (–).

Career
Davey was drafted by the Blue Jays in the 25th round of the 1994 amateur draft. In December , the Baltimore Orioles claimed Davey in the minor league draft, but returned him to the Blue Jays three months later due to his lackluster performance overall.

Davey pitched in seven major league baseball games, all of them as a relief pitcher. He has accumulated a lifetime record of 1–6, finished 27 games, and had 1 save in 36-2/3 innings pitched. His lifetime earned run average was 8.45 for an Adjusted ERA+ of 101. In 11 games for the Padres in 2000, Davey had a 2–1 record with 6.48 earned run average (Adjusted ERA+ of 600) in 12-2/3 innings. Davey earned a salary of $27,000 in his final season with the Padres.

From  until , Davey pitched for the Hiroshima Toyo Carp from 2003 until  and for the Orix Buffaloes from  until . He did not pitch in the 2008 season for the Buffaloes because of shoulder surgery. He was released by the Buffaloes on August 11, 2008. He was signed by the Camden Riversharks of the Atlantic League on April 7, 2009.

Davey underwent a fourth shoulder surgery in early 2010, and while he hoped to attempt another comeback, the repair did not heal well enough to allow him to continue pitching.

References

External links

1973 births
Living people
American expatriate baseball players in Canada
American expatriate baseball players in Japan
Baseball players from Michigan
Camden Riversharks players
Dunedin Blue Jays players
Hagerstown Suns players
Henry Ford Hawks baseball players
Hiroshima Toyo Carp players
Knoxville Smokies players
Lake Elsinore Storm players
Las Vegas Stars (baseball) players
Major League Baseball pitchers
Medicine Hat Blue Jays players
Nippon Professional Baseball pitchers
Orix Buffaloes players
Pawtucket Red Sox players
Portland Beavers players
San Diego Padres players
Seattle Mariners players
St. Catharines Blue Jays players
Syracuse SkyChiefs players
Tacoma Rainiers players
Toronto Blue Jays players